José is a predominantly Spanish and Portuguese form of the given name Joseph. While spelled alike, this name is pronounced differently in each language: Spanish ; Portuguese  (or ).

In French, the name José, pronounced , is an old vernacular form of Joseph, which is also in current usage as a given name. José is also commonly used as part of masculine name composites, such as José Manuel, José Maria or Antonio José, and also in female name composites like Maria José or Marie-José. The feminine written form is Josée as in French.

In Netherlandic Dutch, however, José is a feminine given name and is pronounced ; it may occur as part of name composites like Marie-José or as a feminine first name in its own right; it can also be short for the name Josina and even a Dutch hypocorism of the name Johanna.

In England, Jose is originally a Romano-Celtic surname, and people with this family name can usually be found in, or traced to, the English county of Cornwall, where it was especially frequent during the fourteenth century; this surname is pronounced , as in the English names Joseph or Josephine. According to another interpretation Jose is cognate with Joyce; Joyce is an English and Irish surname derived from the Breton personal name Iodoc, which was introduced to England by the Normans in the form Josse. In medieval England the name was occasionally borne by women but more commonly by men; the variant surname Jose is local to Devon and Cornwall.

The common spelling of this given name in different languages is a case of interlingual homography. Similar cases occur in English given names (Albert, Bertrand, Christine, Daniel, Eric, and Ferdinand) that are not exclusive to the English language and can be found namely in French with a different pronunciation under exactly the same spelling.

Spanish pronunciation
In Castilian Spanish, the initial  is similar to the German  in the name Bach and Scottish Gaelic and Irish  in loch, though Spanish  varies by dialect.

Historically, the modern pronunciation of the name José in Spanish is the result of the phonological history of Spanish coronal fricatives since the fifteenth century, when it departed from Old Spanish. Unlike today's pronunciation of this name, in Old Spanish the initial  was a voiced postalveolar fricative (as the sound "je" in French), and the middle  stood for a voiced apicoalveolar fricative /z̺/ (as in the Castilian pronunciation of the word mismo). The sounds, from a total of seven sibilants once shared by medieval Ibero-Romance languages, were partly preserved in Catalan, Galician, and Occitan, and have survived integrally in Mirandese and in the dialects of northern Portugal.

In those regions of north-western Spain where the Galician and Asturian languages are spoken, the name is spelt Xosé and pronounced .

Portuguese pronunciation
Examples of this are for instance former President of the European Commission José Manuel Barroso and football coach José Mourinho.
Historically, the conventional Portuguese spelling of the name was Joseph, just as in English, though variants like Jozeph were not uncommon. Following the 1910 revolution, the Portuguese spelling was modernized. Joseph, Nazareth) and replaced them with the diacritic on the final , indicating the stress vowel (e.g. José, Nazaré).

The Portuguese phonology developed originally from thirteenth-century Galician-Portuguese, having a number of speakers worldwide that is currently larger than French, Italian and German.

French vernacular form
The French given name José, pronounced , is an old vernacular form of the French name Joseph, and is also popular under the feminine form Josée. The masculine form is current as a given name, or as short for Joseph as is the case of French politician José Bové. The same masculine form is also commonly used as part of feminine name composites, as is the case of French athlete Marie-José Pérec. In turn, the feminine form Josée is only used customarily either as a feminine first name or as part of a feminine name composite, with respective examples in French film director Josée Dayan and Canadian actress Marie-Josée Croze.

Jewish use
A number of prominent Jewish men, including sportsmen, entertainers and historical figures, are known publicly as Joseph or Jose, another form of Yossi (Hebrew: יֹוסִי), and a diminutive of Yosef or Yossef (Hebrew: יוֹסֵף).

Feminine form
The name José also occurs in feminine name composites (e.g. Maria José, Marie-José).

Josée is a French feminine first name, pronounced , relates to the longer feminine form of Joséphine , and may also be coupled with other names in feminine name composites.

Similarly, in Flemish, José is a male given name, for which the feminine written form is Josée, with both forms being pronounced , but the spelling stems originally from neighboring French-speaking influence.

In Dutch, however, José is pronounced , which is a feminine given name in its own right, sometimes also used as short for the feminine name Josina. Examples are Olympic swimmer José Damen and pop singer José Hoebee.

Josephine and Joséphine are in use in English-speaking countries, while Josefine is popular in Western Europe.

Diminutives
One of the common Spanish diminutives of the name is Pepe, which is a repetition of the last syllable of the earlier form Josep. (Popular belief attributes the origin of Pepe to the abbreviation of pater putativus, P.P., recalling the role of St Joseph in predominantly Catholic Spanish-speaking countries.) In Hispanic America, the diminutives Cheché and Chepe also occur, as in Colombian soccer player José Eugenio ("Cheché") Hernández and Mexican soccer player José ("Chepe") Naranjo.

In Portuguese, the most widely used diminutive form of the name is Zé, and less used forms include Zeca, Zezé, Zezinho, Zuca, and Juca. The augmentative of the diminutive may occur as in Zezão, as well as the diminutive of the diminutive Zequinha, Zezinho, Josesito.

People

Mononyms
 Jose (Malayalam: ജോസ്), Indian actor in Malayalam films
 José of Braganza (Portuguese: Bragança), Portuguese noble of the House of Braganza, Archbishop of Braga, illegitimate son of King Peter II and Francisca Clara da Silva
 Jose the Galilean (Hebrew: יוסי הגלילי, (Yose HaGelili)), 1st–2nd century Jewish rabbi, member of the Tannaim involved in compiling the Mishna
Prince José, Portuguese noble of the House of Braganza (Portuguese: Bragança), son of Queen Maria I and King Peter III, heir apparent with many titles including Prince of Brazil and Duke of Braganza, died of smallpox at age 27 before ascending to the throne
 Joseph I of Portugal (José Francisco António Inácio Norberto Agostinho), also known as José I of Portugal

First names

A

 José Abad Santos, Filipino lawyer and jurist, 5th Chief Justice of the Supreme Court of the Philippines 
 José Abal, Spanish Paralympics athlete and medallist
  José Manuel Abascal Gómez, Spanish runner and Olympics medallist
 José Javier Abella Fanjul, Mexican international football player
 Jose ben Abin (Hebrew: יוסי בר אבין), significant 4th century CE Jewish Talmudist
 José Aboulker, French Algerian neurosurgeon, leader of French Algeria's anti-Nazi resistance during World War II, later a French politician 
 José Antonio Abreu Anselmi, Venezuelan orchestra conductor, pianist, economist, professor of economics and law at Universidad Simón Bolívar, activist, and politician 
 José María de Achá Valiente, Bolivian general, 17th President of Bolivia after leading a coup against dictator José María Linares
 José de Acosta, member of the Society of Jesus (S.J.), Spanish Catholic missionary, theologian and naturalist
 José Adem (1921–1991), Mexican mathematician 
 José Manuel Cerqueira Afonso dos Santos, also known to the public as José Afonso, Zeca Afonso and Zeca, influential Portuguese folk and political musician, known especially for the role of his music in the resistance against the dictatorial regime of Oliveira Salazar 
 José Bernardo Alcedo, Peruvian Romantic composer, wrote the National Anthem of Peru 
 José Aldo da Silva Oliveira Jnr., Brazilian mixed martial artist
 José Martiniano de Alencar, Brazilian politician, lawyer, orator, novelist and dramatist
 José Alencar Gomes da Silva, Brazilian businessman and politician, 23rd Vice-President of Brazil
 Joseph of Anchieta, Spanish Jesuit missionary to the Portuguese colony of Brazil and Catholic saint
 José Martiniano Pereira de Alencar, Brazilian politician, journalist and onetime Catholic priest, father of José de Alencar
 José de Jesús Alfaro, Nicaraguan politician, Head of State of Nicaragua
 José Maria Alkmin, Brazilian politician, 15th Vice President of Brazil 
 José Allende, Peruvian politician, 14th Prime Minister of Peru 
 José Alperovich, Argentinian politician, governor of Tucumán Province
 José Carlos Altuve, Venezuelan-born American baseball player 
 José Álvarez de las Asturias de Bohórquez y Goyeneche, Spanish noble and equestrian, Marqués de los Trujillos, Olympics competitor 
 José Álvarez de Pereira y Cubero, Spanish Neoclassical sculptor 
 José Álvarez de Toledo Osorio y Gonzaga, Spanish noble and politician, Duke of Alba, 11th Marquis of Villafranca, Grandee of Spain, 15th Duke of Medina Sidonia, sponsor of Francisco Goya, commissioner of works by Joseph Haydn 
 José Ciriaco Alvarez, also known as José Sixto Alvarez, Argentinian journalist and Modernist writer, wrote under the pen name "Rob" Fray Mocho 
 Jose Lino Alvarez, American professional baseball player
 José Álvarez, United States Virgin Islands-born sports shooter and Olympics competitor
 José Manuel Álvarez. Argentinian politician, Governor of Córdoba
 José Ricardo Álvarez, Venezuelan-born American professional baseball player
 Miguel Álvarez Pozo, Cuban basketball player and Olympics competitor
 José René Álvarez Ramírez, known as Joe Alvarez, Cuban-born American baseball player and manager
 José María Álvarez de Sotomayor, Spanish playwright and poet
 José Alves da Costa, Brazilian Catholic bishop, Bishop of Corumbá
 José Augusto Alves Roçadas, military officer and colonial administrator, led troops at the Battle of Mufilo in Portuguese Angola to suppress the Ovambo people's revolt, appointed as governor of the District of Hula in Portuguese Angola, then Governor of Macau, and returned as Governor General of Angola, commanded troops in Southern Angola against the German army's WWI campaign in Angola, later participated in the 28 May 1926 coup d'état which ended the Portuguese First Republic
 José Ramón Andrés Puerta, Spanish-American chef 
 José Ruiz Arenas, Bolivian Catholic bishop, Assistant bishop of Bogotá, then Bishop and later Archbishop of Villavicencio, entered the Roman Curia and served in the Pontifical Commission for Latin America, the Pontifical Council for the Promotion of the New Evangelisation and the Congregation for the Evangelization of Peoples
  José María Arguedas Altamirano, Peruvian novelist, poet, and anthropologist 
 José Arpa y Perea, Spanish-born painter, worked in Spain, Mexico, and Texas, known for realist landscapes 
 José Enrique Arrarás, Puerto Rican lawyer, university lecturer and politician, former member of the Legislative Assembly of Puerto Rico 
 José Miguel Arroyo Delgado, known as Joselito, Spanish matador 
 José Gervasio Artigas, Uruguayan national hero 
 José Luis Astigarraga Lizarralde, Peruvian Catholic bishop, Bishop of the Apostolic Vicariate of Yurimaguas
 José Millán Astray, Spanish general and founder of the Spanish Foreign Legion 
 José de Avillez Burnay Ereira, award-winning Portuguese chef and restaurateur
 José María Alfredo Aznar López, Spanish reformist and politician, active member of the Falangist Syndicalist Student Front in his youth, President of the People's Party, served as Prime Minister under King Juan Carlos I

B

 José Delicado Baeza, Spanish Catholic bishop, Bishop of Tui-Vigo, Archbishop of Valladolid
 José Ballivián, Bolivian general during the Peruvian-Bolivian War and 11th President of Bolivia
 José Manuel Emiliano Balmaceda Fernández, 11th President of Chile 
 José Antonio Balseiro, Argentinian physicist, specialised in nuclear fusion and nuclear physics
 José Balta y Montero, Peruvian soldier and politician, 13th Prime Minister of Peru, 30th President of Peru 
 José Celso Barbosa, Puerto Rican physician, sociologist and politician 
 José Juan Barea Mora, known as "J. J.", Puerto Rican-born American professional international basketball player
 José Barrionuevo, Spanish politician 
 José Pablo Torcuato Batlle y Ordóñez, Uruguayan politician, creator of the welfare state, 2nd and 5th President of the Senate and Prime Minister of Uruguay, 19th and 21st President of Uruguay
 José Antonio Bautista Santos, Dominican-born American baseball player 
 José Joaquín (Arias) Bautista, Dominican-born American baseball player 
 Jose Baxter, UK professional football player
 José Leitão de Barros, Portuguese film director and playwright 
 José Manuel Durão Barroso, Portuguese lawyer and professor of law, 115th Prime Minister of Portugal, 11th President of the European Commission 
 José Moreira Bastos Neto, Brazilian Catholic bishop, Bishop of Três Lagoas
 José Díaz de Bedoya, Paraguayan politician, member of the Paraguayan Triumvirate 
 José Fernando Bello Amigo Serans, Spanish professional football player 
 José Alfonso Belloso y Sánchez, Salvadoran Catholic bishop, Auxiliary bishop then Archbishop of San Salvador 
 José Luis Benavidez Jr., American professional boxer 
 José María Benegas Haddad, nicknamed as Txiki, Venezuelan-born Spanish politician 
 José Benlliure y Gil, Spanish painter and sculptor
  José Bergamín Gutiérrez, Spanish writer, essayist, poet, and playwright
 José Miguel Bermúdez Ríos, Spanish professional football player
 José León Bernal, Spanish football player 
 José Orlando Berríos, Puerto Rican-born American professional baseball player
 José Avelino Bettencourt, Portuguese-Canadian Catholic bishop, diplomat and chaplain to the Pope, former Head of Protocol of the Secretariat of State of the Holy See, now Apostolic Nuncio to Georgia and Armenia 
 José González Blázquez, member of the Order of the Blessed Virgin Mary of Mercy and Spanish Catholic bishop, Bishop of Ciudad Rodrigo, then Bishop of Plascencia 
 José María Bocanegra, Mexican lawyer and politician, Interim President of Mexico
 Joseph Bonaparte, French King 
 José Borregales (born 1998), American football player
 José Antonio Bottiroli, Argentinian composer, pianist and poet
 Joseph (José) Bové, French farmer, politician and syndicalist 
 José Antonio Bowen, American jazz musician and president of Goucher College 
 José Luis Brown, retired Argentinian football player and coach 
  José Brocá y Codina (Catalan: Antoni Josep Mateu Brocà i Codina), Spanish guitarist and Romantic composer 
 José María Bueno y Monreal, Spanish Catholic bishop and cardinal, first Bishop of Jaca, then Bishop of Vitoria, Coadjutor bishop of Seville and finally Archbishop of Seville, made Cardinal by Pope John XXIII 
 Jose Apolonio Burgos y García, Filipino Catholic priest and activist executed by the Spanish authorities 
 José Bustamante y Rivero, Peruvian lawyer, jurist, writer, politician, and diplomat, 33rd President of Peru, President of the International Court of Justice in The Hague

C

 José María Cabral y Luna, Dominican general and politician, Supreme Chief of the Dominican Republic, then President, abolished capital punishment and banishment 
 José María Calatrava y Peinado, Spanish statesman, served as Prime Minister under Consort Queen Maria Christina, Regent of Spain 
 José Manuel Calderón Borrallo, Spanish professional basketball player 
 José de Jesus Calderón Frias, Panamanian football player 
 José Luis Calderón, Argentinian football player 
 José Luis Calderón Cabrera, Mexican architect and professor, specialist in restoration of churches and monuments
 José Manuel Calderón, known as El Maestro de Bachata, first Dominican Republic musician to record bachata 
  José Campeche y Jordán, recognised Puerto Rican Rococo painter 
 José Canalejas y Méndez, Spanish literary scholar and politician, served as Prime Minister under King Alfonso XIII
 José María Cano, Spanish visual artist, pianist, musician, composer, and record producer 
 José María Ortega Cano, known as Joselito, Spanish matador 
 José Canseco Capas Jr., known as José Canesco, Cuban-American baseball player
 Jose Pablo Cantillo, American stage, television and film actor
  José Raúl Capablanca y Graupera, Cuban chess player and world chess champion, considered to be one of the best players of all time
 José Carbó, Argentinian-born Australian baritone 
 José María Cárdenas López, Mexican international football player 
 José Cardoso Pires, Portuguese author of short stories, novels, plays, and political satire 
 José María Caro Rodríguez, Chilean Catholic bishop and cardinal, Apostolic Vicar of Tarapac, Bishop then Archbishop of La Serena, then Archbishop of Santiago de Chile, made a Cardinal by Pope Pius XII in 1946, a strong opponent of Freemasonry he wrote frequently on the subject including The Mystery of Freemasonry Unveiled.
 José Maria Carreño Blanco, Venezuelan politician and military officer, Interim President, Vice President 
 José Miguel Carrera Verdugo, Chilean general, considered one of the founders of independent Chile, leader under the junta government, Supreme Director of Chile
 José Carreras, Catalan tenor 
 José de Carvajal y Lancáster, Spanish jurist and statesman, served as First Secretary of State under King Ferdinand IV, founded Madrid's Real Academia de Bellas Artes de San Fernando 
 José Arturo Castellanos Contreras, former Salvadoran army colonel and diplomat, El Salvador's World War II Consul General to Geneva, recognised as having saved up to 40,000 Jews and Central Europeans from Nazi persecution
 José de Jesús Castillo Rentería, Mexican Catholic bishop, Bishop of Tuxtepec
 José Luis Castillo, Mexican boxer 
 Jose Ceballos, American Government Affairs Director for the National Air Traffic Controllers Association (NATCA)
 José Marti Ceda Marte, Dominican-born Americanbaseball player
 José Dimas Cedeño Delgado, Panamanian Catholic bishop, Bishop of Veraguas, then Archbishop of Panamá 
 Juan C. Centeno, Puerto Rican-born American baseball player
 José Domingo Cervantes Padilla, Mexican professional football player 
 José Francisco Cevallos Enríquez, Ecuadorian professional football player 
 José Xavier de Cerveira e Sousa, Portuguese professor at the University of Coimbra and Catholic bishop, Bishop of Funchal, Bishop of Beja, then Bishop of Viseu 
 Jose Chameleone, stage name for Ugandan Afrobeat singer Joseph Mayanja 
 José Antonio Chang Escobedo, Peruvian politician, 144th Prime Minister of Peru 
 José Francisco Chaves, military leader, politician, lawyer and rancher from the New Mexico Territory 
 José Ignacio Cienfuegos Arteaga, Chilean friar of the Dominican Order (O.P.), politician, diplomat and Catholic bishop, advocate for the independence of Chile, twice President of the Senate of Chile, twice Ambassador to the Holy See, Bishop of Concepción (now known as the Archdiocese of Concepción) 
 Josep Climent i Avinent, also known as José Climent, Spanish Catholic bishop, theology professor at the University of Valencia, Bishop of Barcelona (now known as the Archdiocese of Barcelona 
 José Eusebio Colombres. Argentinian statesman and Catholic bishop-elect, accredited with the foundation of the sugarcane industry in Tucumán Province, Bishop-Elect of Salta but died before being consecrated
 Juan José Revueltas Colomer, Spanish-American composer 
 José Gutiérrez de la Concha, Spanish noble under the titles 1st Marquis of Havana, 1st Viscount of Cuba and Grandee of Spain, military general, politician and statesman, served as Prime Minister under Queen Isabella II
 José Corazón de Jesús also known under the pen name Huseng Batute, Filipino poet
 José Luis Corcuera, former Spaniard politician
 José Andrés Corral Arredondo, Mexican Catholic bishop, Bishop of Parral 
 José Alves Correia da Silva, Portuguese Catholic bishop, Bishop of Leiria (now known as the Diocese of Leiria-Fátima)
 José Correia da Serra, Portuguese abbé, philosopher, diplomat, politician and naturalist, the plant genus Correa is named in his honour
 José Justo Corro, Mexican lawyer, politician, and 10th President of the Centralist Republic of Mexico
 José Corticchiato, French publisher, the Parisienne bookshop and publishing house José Corti was named after him.
 José Guillermo Cortines, Dominican actor, musician, writer and television host
 José María Justo Cos y Macho, Spanish Catholic bishop and cardinal, also served in Cuba, Bishop of Mondoñedo (now known as the Diocese of Mondoñedo-Ferrol), Archbishop of Santiago de Cuba, Bishop of Madrid-Alcala (now known as the Archdiocese of Madrid) with the personal title of "Archbishop", Archbishop of Valladolid, made Cardinal by Pope Pius X in 1911 
 José da Costa Campos, Portuguese-Goan military officer and colonial administrator, field marshal of the Portuguese army in Portuguese India
 José Miguel Cotto, Puerto Rican boxer
 José Bezerra Coutinho, Brazilian Catholic bishop, Auxiliary bishop of Sobral, then Bishop of Estância 
 Francisco José Cox Huneeus, priest of the Institute of Schönstatt Fathers, Chilean Catholic bishop, Bishop of Chillán, then Archbishop of La Serena, resigned due to never-proven allegations of sexual abuse 
 Jose Antonio de Cuervo, Mexican on whose land granted by King Ferdinand VI of Spain the first blue agave was planted for the production of tequila 
 Jose Maria Guadalupe Cuervo y Montana, son of Jose Antonio de Cuervo, first to produce tequila in Mexico
 José Cura, Argentinian tenor 
 Jose Vicente de la Quadra Lugo, known as Vicente Cuadra, Nicaraguan landowner and politician, 4th President of Nicaragua
 Josse van Clichtove, known in Latin as Judocus Clichtoveus Neoportuensis, Belgian theologian, Humanist, teacher and author, profuse antagonist of Martin Luther, librarian and tutor at the Sorbonne

D

 José van Dam (Joseph, Baron Van Damme), Belgian bass-baritone
 José Damen, Dutch swimmer, Olympics competitor 
 José da Silva Varela, known as Ze, São Toméan football player 
 José Antonio Dávila Morales, post-modern Puerto Rican poet
 José Luis DeJesús, American baseball player
 José Delbo, Argentinian comics artist
 José Manuel Rodriguez Delgado, Spanish-born professor of physiology at Yale University 
 José Dias Coelho, Portuguese painter and sculptor, opposed to the dictatorship of Oliveira Salazar, assassinated by the security agency International and State Defense Police
 José Diaz, sergeant in the Toa Alta Militia, defended Puerto Rico from British invasion in 1797
 José Diaz, Argentine football player and Olympics competitor
 José Diaz, Spanish rugby union player
 Jose Diaz-Balart, Cuban-American journalist and television anchorman
 José Diaz Ramos, Spanish trade unionist and politician 
 José Antonio Díaz, Cuban fencer and Olympics competitor
 Jose Antonio Diaz, known as Coco, Joey or Karate, Cuban-born American comedian, actor and podcast host
 José Daniel Díaz Robertti, Venezuelan freestyle wrestler
 José Eduvigis Díaz Vera, Paraguayan general, leading figure in the Paraguayan War, hero of the Battle of Curupayty
 José Enrique Díaz Barrera, Spanish football manager
 José Félix Díaz, American politician, former member of the Florida House of Representatives 
 José Guadalupe A. Díaz Rivera, Spanish football manager and former player
 José Ignacio Díaz Velázquez, Spanish racewalker and Olympics competitor 
 José Luis Díaz, Argentinian professional football player
 José Manuel Díaz Fernández, Spanish football player and manager 
 José Manuel Díaz Gallego, Spanish international road cyclist
 José María Díaz, Spanish journalist, Romantic style playwright 
 José Narciso Díaz, Cuban fencer and Olympics competitor
 José Pedro Díaz, Uruguyan intellectual, author and poet, listed among the writers known as the Generación del 45
 Jose Rafael Diaz, nicknamed as "Jumbo", Dominican-American professional baseball player
 José Gabriel Diaz Cueva, Ecuadorian Catholic bishop, Auxiliary bishop of Guayaquil, Auxiliary Bishop of Cuenca, then Bishop of Azogues 
 José Ramón Díaz Hernández, Puerto Rican politician and senator
 José van Dijck, pseudonym for Johanna Francisca Theodora Maria "José" van Dijck, Dutch author and professor of comparative media studies, University of Amsterdam 
 José Maximino Eusebio Domínguez y Rodríguez, Cuban Catholic bishop, Auxiliary bishop of San Cristóbal de la Habana, then Bishop of Matanzas 
 José Doreste, Spanish sailboat racer 
 José Doth de Oliveira, Brazilian Catholic bishop, Bishop of Iguatu
 Jose Philip D'Souza, Indian politician

E

 José Maria de Eça de Queiroz, Portuguese writer 
 José Echegaray, Spanish statesman, dramatist and Nobel Prize in literature 
 Juan José Eguiara y Eguren, Mexican of Basque descent, Catholic scholar and bishop, Bishop of Chilapa, member of the faculty and later rector of the University of Mexico, author of the incomplete Bibliotheca mexicana, the country's first comprehensive bibliography of ideas
 José Mariano Elízaga, Mexican Romantic composer, music theorist, pianist, organist and music teacher 
  José Eugenio Ellauri y Obes, Uruguyan lawyer and politician, 9th President of Uruguay
 José Longinos Ellauri Fernández, Uruguyan politician, father of  José Eugenio Ellauri y Obes
 Jose Marcelo Ejercito Sr., commonly known as Joseph "Erap" Estrada, 13th president of the Philippines 
 José de Escandón, Spanish noble titled 1st Count of Sierra Gorda, soldier to the rank of colonel in New Spain where he was engaged in various military actions, led the colonization of Nuevo Santander, became known as the "father of the lower Rio Grande Valley"
 José Gonzalo Escobar, Mexican Army general and leader of the failed Escobar Rebellion 
 José Luis Escobar Alas, Salvadoran Catholic bishop, Auxiliary bishop then Bishop of San Vicente, Archbishop of San Salvador 
 José Manuel Estepa Llaurens, Spanish Catholic bishop and cardinal, Auxiliary Bishop of Madrid, then Ordinary of the Military Archbishopric of Spain, one of six bishops who redacted the Catholic Catechism, made Cardinal by Pope Benedict XVI
  José Félix Estigarribia Insaurralde, Paraguayan agronomist, diplomat, army officer at the rank of Marshal and Commander-in-Chief of the armed services, decorated war hero, 34th President of Paraguay, self-appointed dictator

F

 José Fabio, Paraguayan basketball player 
 José Freire Falcão, Brazilian Catholic bishop and cardinal, Archbishop of Brasilia, made a Cardinal by Pope John Paul II in 1988
 José Carlos Frita Falcão, Portuguese matador 
 José Luis Falcón, Spanish athlete and Olympics competitor
 José Feliciano (José Monserrate Feliciano García), Puerto Rican guitarist, singer and songwriter
 José Carlos Fernández González, Bolivian professional football player
 José Carlos Fernández Piedra, nicknamed as Zlatan, Peruvian professional football player 
 José Delfín Fernández Gómez, Cuban-born American professional baseball player
 José dos Santos Ferreira, Macanese poet and writer
 José Ferrer Esteve de Fujadas, Spanish guitarist and composer
 José Vicente Ferrer de Otero y Cintrón, Puerto Rican actor, film and stage director, winner of the Academy Award 
 José Silvestre Ferreira Bossa, Portuguese noble and military officer to the rank of general, served twice as Governor of Angola, as Governor of Macau, and as Governor of Mozambique, was Plenipotentiary Minister to China
 José María Figueres Olsen, Costa Rican businessman and politician, 42nd President of Costa Rica with special interests in climate change, Sustainable development and technology
 José Manuel Figueroa, Jr., Mexican-born American singer, songwriter, and actor 
 Chico Flores, born José Manuel Flores Moreno, Spanish professional football player 
 José Joaquín Flórez Hernández, Colombian Catholic bishop, Archbishop of Ibagué
 José Miguel da Rocha Fonte, Portuguese-born international professional football player 
 Giuseppe "José" Foralosso, Brazilian Catholic bishop, Bishop of Marabá
 José Gil Fortoul, Venezuelan writer, historian, politician and a member of Venezuelan Positivism, supporter of Juan Vicente Gómez's dictatorship, President of Venezuela 
 José Gaspar Rodríguez de Francia y Velasco, Paraguayan lawyer and politician, first dictator after the independence of Paraguay, commonly known as El Supremo, a reference to his official title "Supreme and Perpetual Dictator of Paraguay"
 José Frèches, French historical novelist 
 José Freire de Oliveira Neto, Brazilian Catholic bishop, Bishop of Mossoró 
 José de Freitas Ribeiro, Portuguese naval officer, served as acting Governor-General of Mozambique, member of the Constitutional Junta that ruled Portugal for one day in 1915, served as Governor-General of Portuguese India

G

 José de Jesús García Ayala, Mexican Catholic bishop, first appointed as Auxiliary Bishop and then as Bishop of Campeche
José García Hernández (1915–2000), Spanish politician
 José Mariano Garibi y Rivera, Mexican Catholic bishop and cardinal, first appointed as Auxiliary bishop of the Archdiocese of Guadalajara, then as Coadjutor bishop of the same See, and finally as Archbishop of Guadalajara, made Cardinal by Pope John XXIII in 1958, first Mexican so appointed 
 José Manuel Gallegos, American Catholic priest and politician, Territory of New Mexico delegate to the US Congress 
 José Hugo Garaycoa Hawkins, Peruvian Catholic bishop, Auxiliary bishop of Lima, then Bishop of Tacna y Moquegua 
 José Luis García-López, Spanish comic book artist
 Mario José García Rodriguez, Spanish water polo player and Olympics competitor
 José Gaspar, Spanish pirate, known as the last of the Buccaneers 
 José Martín Antonio Gautier Benítez, Puerto Rican Romantic poet 
 José Aurelio Gay, Spanish football player and manager 
 Juan José Gerardi Conedera, Guatemalan Catholic bishop and human rights defender especially Mayan rights, Bishop of Verapaz, Bishop of Quiché, then Auxiliary Bishop of Santiago de Guatemala, assassinated by members of the Salvadoran military 
 José Gil, born in Portuguese Mozambique, Portuguese philosopher and author 
 José Giovanni, French-Swiss writer and film director 
 José Giral y Pereira, Spanish politician, served as Prime Minister during the Second Spanish Republic 
 José Goldemberg, Brazilian physicist, university professor, scientific leader and Research scientist, leading expert on energy and environmental issues
 José Roilo Gólez, Filipino politician 
 José Gomes Ferreira, Portuguese poet and fiction writer, activist against the dictatorship of Oliveira Salazar 
 José Gómez Ortega, known as Joselito, famous Spanish matador
 José Horacio Gómez, Mexican-born US Catholic bishop, Auxiliary Bishop of Denver, Archbishop of San Antonio, then Archbishop of Los Angeles
 José Miguel Gómez Rodríguez, Colombian Catholic bishop, Bishop of Líbano–Honda, then Bishop of Facatativá 
 José Aparecido Gonçalves de Almeida, Brazilian Catholic bishop, appointed as an officer and the Under-Secretary of the Pontifical Council for Legislative Texts, then Auxiliary Bishop of Brasília 
 José González, Swedish-born Argentine singer and songwriter
 José González, Mexican professional sport shooter and Olympics competitor
 José González, Puerto Rican professional sport shooter and Olympics competitor
 José González, Chilean professional basketball player and Olympics competitor
 José González, Spanish sport shooter and Olympics competitor 
 José González, Spanish swimmer and Olympics competitor
 José Luis González, Mexican composer
 Jose "Pepe" Gonzalez, Spanish comic book artist
 José Rafael González, Dominican-American professional baseball player
 Jose Alejandro Gonzalez Jr., senior United States district judge of the United States District Court for the Southern District of Florida
 José Antonio González, Spanish racewalker and Olympics competitor
 José Antonio Estrada González, Cuban baseball player and Olympics medallist
 Jose B. Gonzalez, Salvadoran Latino poet and educator
 José Emilio González, also known as Josemilio González, Puerto Rican writer, literary critic, editor, university lecturer and politician, winner of the American Book Award
 José Francisco González, known as Paton, Venezuelan professional football player
 José Froilán González, Argentinian award-winning racing driver
 José Huertas González, known as "The Prophet" and later as "Invader I", Puerto Rican professional wrestler
 José Luis González, Puerto Rican essayist, novelist, Short story writer, university professor, and journalist 
 Jose Luis Gonzalez, also known as J.L. Goez and Joe L. Gonzalez, designer, painter, muralist, sculptor, restorer, ceramicist, importer, and arts administrator 
 José Maldonado González, last president of the Spanish Republican government in Exile 
 José Ignacio González Catalán, Chilean professional football player 
 José Ramón González, Puerto Rican economist and businessman
 José Antonio González Caviedes, Spanish politician
 José Luis González China, Mexican football manager and former player 
 José Luis González Dávila, known as La Calaca, Mexican professional football player and two-time Olympics competitor
 José Manuel González Santamaría, Spanish Paralympic athlete and medallist
 José González Díez, Spanish Catholic friar of the Dominican Order (O.P.) and bishop, Bishop of Palemcia, Bishop of Pamplona (now known as the Archdiocese of Pamplona y Tudela, Archbishop of Santiago de Compostela, and Archbishop of Burgos
 José González Ganoza, Peruvian international football player
 José González García, Mexican chess grandmaster
 José Manuel González Hernández, nicknamed El Meme, Salvadoran professional football player 
 José del Carmen González Joly, Panamanian professional football player
 José González-Lander, Venezuelan-born civil engineer, responsible for the planning, design and construction of the Caracas Metro
 José Manuel González López, known professionally as José, Spanish football player and coach
 José Eleuterio González-Mendoza, Mexican physician and philanthropist, founder of two major hospitals
 José González Morfin, Mexican politician and lawyer 
 José González Ortiz, Puerto Rican politician and former mayor of Luquillo 
 José M. González-Páramo, Spanish economist and bank executive, economic adviser to several major public and private institutions including the Banco de España, the European Commission, the International Monetary Fund and the World Bank Group
 José Norberto Francisco González Rubio, O.F.M., religious name was José María de Jesús, Franciscan friar and Catholic priest, prominent in the early history of California
 José Antonio González de Salas, Spanish humanist and writer
 José Luis González Sánchez, Spanish award-winning runner 
 José Joel González Sandoval, Mexican professional football player
 José Emilio González Velázquez, Puerto Rican politician and Senator 
 Antonio José González Zumárraga, Ecuadorian Catholic bishop and cardinal, member of the Society of Jesus (S.J.), Auxiliary bishop of Quito, Bishop of Machala, Coadjutor bishop and then Archbishop of Quito, made a Cardinal by Pope John Paul II in 2001 
 José del Carmen Soberanis González, Mexican politician 
 José Gottardi Cristelli, Italian-born Uruguyan Catholic bishop, member of the Salesians of Don Bosco (S.D.B.), Auxiliary bishop of Mercedes, Archbishop of Montevideo
 José de Grimaldo y Gutiérrez de Solórzano, Spanish noble titled 1st Marquess of Grimaldo and statesman, served three times as Secretary of the Universal Bureau under King Philip V 
 José Nicomedes Grossi, Brazilian Catholic bishop, Bishop of Bom Jesus da Lapa 
 José María Guerrero de Arcos y Molina, Nicaraguan-born politician, Acting Head of State of Honduras, then Head of State of Nicaragua
  José Patricio Guggiari Corniglione, Paraguayan politician, 32nd President of Paraguay 
 José María Guido, 33rd President of Argentina
 José Ángel Gurría, Mexican economist and diplomat, Secretary General of the OECD

H

 Jose ben Halafta (Yose ben Halafta. Hebrew: רבי יוסי בן חלפתא), leading 2nd century CE scholar of halakha and aggadah, mentioned frequently in the Mishnah
 José-Maria de Heredia, Cuban-born French poet
 José Hernandez, Argentinian journalist, poet, and politician, best known as author of the epic poem Martín Fierro 
 José Gregorio Hernández, Venezuelan physician, noted for treating the poor without charge, since his death has gained popular recognition in Latin America and Spain as a source of miraculous healing and is invoked by the name "José Gregoriano", given the title "Venerable" by Pope Francis, now being considered for beatification
 José M. Hernández, American astronaut 
 José María Hernández González, Mexican Catholic bishop, Bishop of Chilapa (now known as the Diocese of Chilpancingo-Chilapa), then Bishop of Netzahualcóyotl (now known as the Diocese of Valle de Chalco) 
 José Joaquín de Herrera, Mexican politician, general in the Mexican Army during the Mexican–American War, three times President of Mexico
 José Hoebee, Dutch pop singer 
 José Maria de Sousa Horta e Costa, also known as also known as José Maria de Sousa Horta e Costa (de) Almeida e Vasconcelos, Portuguese soldier, politician and diplomat, twice Governor of Macau, and Governor of Portuguese India

I

 José María Iglesias Inzáurraga, Mexican lawyer, professor, journalist and politician, President of the Supreme Court, Interim President of Mexico
 José Miguel Infante y Rojas, Chilean statesman and politician, leader under the junta government
 José Miguel Insulza, Chilean politician, 9th Secretary General of the Organization of American States 
 José Ingenieros, born as Giuseppe Ingegnieri, Argentinian physician, pharmacist, positivist philosopher and essayist
 José Iturbi, Spanish conductor, harpsichordist and pianist
 José Heriberto Izquierdo Mena, Colombian-born international football player 
 José María Izuzquiza Herranz, Spanish-born Peruvian Catholic bishop, member of the Society of Jesus (S.J.), Bishop of the Apostolic Vicariate of Jaén in Peru

J

 José James, American musician, composer and bandleader 
 José Jardim, Curaçaoan politician
 José de Jesús, nicknamed Cagüitas, Puerto Rican professional boxer
 José de Jesús, Puerto Rican long-distance runner
 Jose de Jesus, often referred to as Ping de Jesus, Filipino politician
 José Luis de Jesús Miranda, Puerto Rican-born American evangelist who claimed to be Jesus Christ and the Antichrist 
 José Jiménez Fernández, known as Joselito, Spanish child star singer and songwriter, entrepreneur in adulthood, jailed for gun and drug trafficking
 José Alfredo Jiménez-Sandoval, Mexican singer and songwriter of rancheras
 José Mariano Jiménez Wald, Peruvian lawyer, jurist and politician, twice Prime Minister of Peru 
 José María Jover Zamora, Spanish historian, university professor, influential in the development of Spanish historiography
 José Esteve Juan, also known as Giuseppe Esteve Stefano, Spanish Catholic bishop, Bishop of Vieste, then Bishop of Orihuela (now known as the Diocese of Orihuela-Alicante)

L

 José María Cirarda Lachiondo, Spanish Catholic bishop, Auxiliary Bishop of Seville, Bishop of Santander, Bishop of Córdoba, and Archbishop of Pamplona y Tudela 
 José Luis Lacunza Maestrojuán, Spanish-born Panamanian Catholic bishop and cardinal, friar of the Order of Augustinian Recollects (O.A.R.), Auxiliary bishop of Panama, Bishop of Chitré, then Bishop of David, made a Cardinal by Pope Francis in 2015, the first Panamanian to be so appointed 
 José María García Lahiguera, Spanish Catholic bishop, Auxiliary Bishop of Madrid, Bishop of Huelva, Archbishop of Valencia, beatified by Pope Benedict XVI in 2011 
 José María Larrauri Lafuente, Spanish Catholic bishop, first as Auxiliary Bishop of Pamplona (now known as the Archdiocese of Pamplona y Tudela, then as Bishop of Vitoria 
 José María Queipo de Llano y Ruiz de Saravia, known in Spain as Conde de Toreno, Spanish noble under the title 7th Count of Toreno and statesman, served as Prime Minister under Queen Isabella II 
 José Paciano Laurel y García, Philippine judge and politician, first and only president of the brief Second Philippine Republic 
 José Lebrún Moratinos, Venezuelan Catholic bishop and cardinal, Auxiliary bishop of Maracaibo, Bishop of Maracay, Bishop of Valencia en Venezuela (now known as the Archdiocese of Valencia in Venezuela), then Archbishop of Caracas, made a Cardinal by Pope John Paul II in 1983 
 José da Avé-Maria Leite da Costa e Silva, Portuguese friar of the Trinitarian Order and Catholic bishop, became rector of Coimbra's Trinitarian college, then appointed as inquirer (inquisitor) for the Portuguese Inquisition, appointed as Bishop of Angra in the Azores 
 José García de León y Pizarro, Spanish statesman, served as First Secretary of State under King Ferdinand VI
 José Leonilson Bezerra Dias, Brazilian painter, designer and sculptor, represented in major international collections
 José Lewgoy, Brazilian-born American television, film, and theatre actor 
 José Lezama Lima, Cuban writer and poet, considered one of the most influential figures in Latin American literature 
 José Gregorio Liendo Vera, Chilean political activist 
 José de Lima, Brazilian Catholic bishop, Bishop of Itumbiara, then Bishop of Sete Lagoas 
 José Yves Limantour y Márquez, Mexican financier and Secretary of Finance 
 José Limón, Mexican modern dancer and choreographer 
 José María Linares Lizarazu, 16th President of Bolivia then self-declared "Dictator for Life" until overthrown and exiled for life 
 José Linhares, Brazilian lawyer, 14th President of Brazil 
 José Jorge Loayza, Peruvian lawyer, jurist and politician, three times Prime Minister of Peru 
José Cortés López, Spanish magistrate
 José López Domínguez, Spanish military to the rank of colonel and politician, served as Prime Minister under King Alfonso XIII 
 José Ivo Lorscheiter, Brazilian Catholic bishop, Auxiliary bishop of Porto Alegre, then Bishop of Santa Maria (now known as the Archdiocese of Santa Maria, being a proponent of Liberation theology led him into debate with Pope John Paul II and Cardinal Ratzinger, Prefect of the Congregation for the Doctrine of the Faith
 José Guadalupe Padilla Lozano, Mexican Catholic bishop, Bishop of Veracruz

M

 José Ulises Macías Salcedo, Mexican Catholic bishop, Bishop of Mexicali, then Archbishop of Hermosillo 
 José Malcampo y Monge, Spanish noble under the title 3rd Marquis of San Rafael, admiral and politician, served as Prime Minister under King Amadeo I 
 José de Jesús Madera Uribe, American member of the Missionaries of the Holy Spirit (M.Sp.S.) and Catholic bishop, Coadjutor bishop then Bishop of Fresno, then Auxiliary bishop to the Archdiocese for the Military Services, USA 
 José Vital Branco Malhoa, known generally as José Malhoa, Portuguese painter
 José Manuel da Câmara de Atalaia, Portuguese statesman, Catholic bishop and cardinal, before episcopacy appointed to a number of positions by King John V including judge of the Supreme Court of the Inquisition of Lisbon, and Deputy for the Board of the Three States, then by the king's direction to Pope Benedict XIV made Cardinal in 1750, elected as Patriarch of Lisbon in 1754 under the title Dom José I
 José de la Mar, Peruvian military leader to the rank of Brigadier and politician, 2nd and 4th President of Peru 
 José Carlos Mariátegui, Peruvian intellectual, journalist, political philosopher, and activist
 José Marin, Spanish Baroque harpist, guitarist and composer 
 José Romão Martenetz, Ukrainian-born monk of the Order of Saint Basil the Great (O.S.B.M.) and Brazilian Ukrainian Greek Catholic bishop, Assistant bishop of Rio de Janeiro, Apostolic Exarch (Archbishop) of Brazil, first Eparch (Bishop) of the newly created Eparchy of São João Batista em Curitiba
 José Julián Martí Pérez, Cuban poet, essayist, journalist, translator, professor, publisher and national hero, recognised as an important revolutionary philosopher, political theorist and contributor to Latin American literature 
 José Martí y Monsó, Spanish painter, art professor, researcher and museum official, recognised as an expert on Castilian art 
 José Luis Martí Soler, retired Spanish professional football player and manager 
 José María Martín de Herrera y de la Iglesia, Spanish-born Catholic bishop and cardinal who also served in Cuba, Archbishop of Santiago de Cuba, then Archbishop of Santiago de Compostela, made Cardinal by Pope Leo XIII in 1897 
 José Antonio Martínez de Aldunate y Garcés de Marcilla, Chilean Catholic bishop, Bishop of Huamanga (now known as the Archdiocese of Ayacucho), Bishop of Santiago de Chile, then Vice President of the 1810 Junta of Chile 
 José João da Conceição Gonçalves Mattoso, Portuguese Mediaevalist historian and professor 
 José Matsuwa, Mexican Huichol Indian shaman
 José Clemente Maurer, German-born Bolivian Catholic bishop and cardinal, member of the Congregation of the Most Holy Redeemer or Redemptorists (C.Ss.R.), Assistant Bishop of La Paz (now known as the Archdiocese of La Paz), then Archbishop of Sucre, made Cardinal by Pope Paul VI in 1967, the first Bolivian to be so appointed 
 José Agustín Mauri, Argentine-born Italian professional football player 
 Juan José Medina, President of the Provisional Junta of Paraguay 
 José Carlos Melo, Brazilian Catholic bishop, first as AuxiliaryBishop of São Salvador da Bahia, then as Archbishop of Maceió 
 José Mendes, Portuguese sprinter, Olympics competitor 
 José Fernando Ferreira Mendes, often referred to as José F.F. Mendes, Portuguese physicist (statistical physics) and professor of physics, best known for his work in the field of network theory 
 José João Pimenta Costa Mendes, Portuguese cyclist and international competitor 
 José Francisco Miguel António de Mendonça or Mendoça, Portuguese Catholic bishop and cardinal, rector of the University of Coimbra, nominated by King Peter III as Patriarch of Lisbon in 1786 with the name Dom José II, made Cardinal by Pope Pius XI in 1788 
 José Miller, also known as Dr Josie Miller, leader of Cuba's Jewish community and their spokesman with the Cuban Government under Fidel Castro's presidency 
 José Adolfo Mojica Morales, Salvadoran Catholic bishop, Bishop of Sonsonate
 José Rafael Molina Ureña, Dominican politician and diplomat, served briefly as Provisional President after the Dominican Civil War, then terms as Permanent Representative to the United Nations and Ambassador to France 
 José Luis Mollaghan, Argentinian Catholic bishop, Auxiliary bishop of Buenos Aires, Bishop of San Miguel, then Archbishop of Rosario, assigned by Pope Francis to the Congregation for the Doctrine of the Faith to work on the handling of clerical pedophilia 
 José Gregorio Monagas, Venezuelan general and politician, President of Venezuela, brother of José Tadeo Monagas
 José Ruperto Monagas, President of Venezuela, son of José Tadeo Monagas 
 José Tadeo Monagas Burgos, hero of the Venezuelan War of Independence, twice President of Venezuela 
 osé María Moncada Tapia, Nicaraguan revolutionary and politician, 19th President of Nicaragua
 José Pablo Moncayo García, Mexican pianist, percussionist, music teacher, composer and conductor 
 José Moñino y Redondo, Spanish noble titled 1st Count of Floridablanca, jurist, reformist, statesman, served as First Secretary of State under Kings Charles III and Charles IV, usually referred to in modern Spain as Conde de Floridablanca, the plant genus Monnina was named after him
 José Pedro Montero De Candia, Paraguayan paediatrician, university professor and politician, 27th President of Paraguay 
 José María Montes, Argentinian Catholic bishop, Auxiliary Archbishop of La Plata, Bishop of Chascomús
 José María Teclo Morelos Pérez y Pavón, Mexican Catholic priest and rebel leader in the Mexican War of Independence, defrocked and executed for treason 
 José Vianna da Motta (sometimes spelt Viana da Mota), Portuguese pianist, teacher and composer, last pupil of Franz Liszt, the Vianna da Motta International Music Competition was founded in 1957 in his honour
 José Mourinho, Portuguese professional football coach and former football player 
 José David Moya Rojas, Colombian professional football player 
 José Mujica, Venezuelan professional baseball player
 José Alberto "Pepe" Mujica Cordano, Uruguayan politician, former guerrilla with the Tupamaros, 40th President of Uruguay
 José Celestino Bruno Mutis y Bosio, Spanish Catholic priest, medical practitioner, botanist, mathematician and artist

N

 José Luis Narom, also known as José Luis Morán, German-born Spanish composer 
 José Alves dos Santos Neto, Brazilian professional basketball coach 
 José Pires de Almeida Neto, Brazilian jazz guitarist 
 José Sebastião de Almeida Neto, Portuguese Catholic bishop and cardinal who also served in Africa, joined the Franciscan friars (O.F.M. Disc.) after ordination taking the religious name Joseph of the Sacred Heart, nominated by King Luís I first as Bishop of Angola e Congo (now known as the Archdiocese of Luanda), then as Patriarch of Lisbon using the name Dom José III, made a Cardinal by Pope Leo XIII in 1884 
 Bernard Joseph Nolker, known in Brazil as Bernardo José Nolker, American-born Brazilian Catholic bishop, member of the Congregation of the Most Holy Redeemer (C.Ss.R), Bishop of Paranaguá 
 José Maurício Nunes Garcia, Brazilian Catholic priest and Classical composer 
 José Neves (born 1974), Portuguese billionaire businessman, founder of Farfetch
 José Núñez, Nicaraguan politician, several times Head of State of Nicaragua

O
 
 Ignacio Montes de Oca y Obregón, Mexican Catholic bishop, Bishop of Ciudad Victoria, then Bishop of San Luis (now known as the Archdiocese of San Luis Potosí 
 Juan José Omella i Omella, Spanish Catholic bishop and cardinal, Auxiliary Bishop of Zaragoza, Bishop of Barbastro-Monzón, Apostolic Administrator of Huesca and of Jaca, Bishop of Calahorra y La Calzada-Logroño, and Archbishop of Barcelona, made Cardinal by Pope Francis
 José Clemente Orozco, Mexican early modern artist especially known as a genre painter, muralist and lithographer 
 José Francisco Orozco y Jiménez, Mexican Catholic bishop, Bishop of Chiapas, then Archbishop of Guadalajara
 José María Ortega Cano, Spanish matador 
 José Ortega y Gasset, Spanish philosopher
 Jose Ortiz, Puerto Rican-born American jockey 
 José Ortiz Bernal, Spanish football player
 José Alfredo Ortiz Dalliot, Puerto Rican attorney and politician
 José Ortiz-Echagüe, Spanish entrepreneur, industrial and military engineer, pilot and photographer, founder of Construcciones Aeronáuticas SA and honorary lifetime President of SEAT (Sociedad Española de Automóviles de Turismo)
 José Daniel Ortiz Flores, Dominican-born American baseball player
 José Luis Ortiz Irizarry, Puerto Rican-born American baseball player
 José Luis Ortiz Moreno, Spanish astronomer, former Vice-President of the Instituto de Astrofísica de Andalucía
 José Ortiz Moya, Spanish comics artist 
 José Rafael "Piculín" Ortiz Rijos, Puerto Rican-born international basketball player 
 José Tomás Ovalle y Bezanilla, Chilean politician, served twice as provisional President of Chile 
 José Oyanguren, also known as José Cruz de Uyanguren, Basque-born Filipino lawyer, jurist, explorer, founder of a Spanish colony in Nueva Vergera (now called Dávao) and the province of Nueva Guipúzcoa, Mindanao

P

 José Padilla, also known as Abdullah al-Muhajir or Muhajir Abdullah, American convicted of aiding terrorists 
 José Bastos Padilha Neto, Brazilian film director, producer and screenwriter
  José Antonio Páez Herrera, leading military figure in Simón Bolívar rebellion against the Spanish Crown in the Venezuelan War of Independence and then in the independence of Venezuela from's Boliva's Gran Colombia, 1st Head of State after declaring independence from Gran Colombia in 1830, and again in 1839–1843, later exiled then appointed as president on his return in 1851 
 José Palmeira Lessa, Brazilian Catholic bishop, Auxiliary bishop of São Sebastião do Rio de Janeiro, Bishop of Propriá, Coadjutor Archbishop then Archbishop of Aracajú
 José Manuel Inocencio Pando Solares, politician, leading figure in civil war, explorer, later 30th President of Bolivia 
 José Pardo y Barreda, Peruvian politician, 51st Prime Minister of Peru, 42nd and 46th President of Peru
 José Parlá, American painter, sculptor and photographer 
 José Serofia Palma, Filipino Catholic bishop, Archbishop of Palo, Archbishop of Cebu, president of the Catholic Bishops' Conference of the Philippines 
 José Paronella, Spanish immigrant to Australia, founder of Paronella Park 
 Juan José Esteban Paso, Argentinian professor, lawyer and Revolutionary leader, member of the Primera Junta and Junta Grande, member of the First and Second, Triumvirates, representative to the Congress of Tucumán 
 José Manuel Pasquel, Peruvian soldier to the rank of second lieutenant and Catholic bishop, Archbishop of Lima
 José Patiño y Rosales, Spanish statesman, served as 1st Secretary of State under King Philip V 
 José Ignacio Pavón, Mexican lawyer, jurist and politician, unconstitutional substitute President of Mexico
 José María Paz, Argentine military figure notable in the Argentine War of Independence and the Argentine Civil War
 José Luís Peixoto, Portuguese novelist, poet and playwright 
 José Néstor Pékerman Krim, Argentinian football coach and manager
 José Rafael Peralta, Dominican-born American politician, representing District 13 in the New York State Senate
 José Francisco Peraza Polo, Venezuelan-born American professional baseball player
 José Pedro Pérez-Llorca, Spanish lawyer, politician and contributor to the 1978 Spanish Constitution
 José Luis Perales, Spanish singer and songwriter 
José de Almeida Batista Pereira, Brazilian Catholic bishop, Auxiliary bishop of Niteroi, Bishop of Sete Lagaos, then Bishop of Guaxupé 
 José de Aquino Pereira, Brazilian Catholic bishop, Bishop of Dourados, Bishop of Presidente Prudente, then Bishop of São José do Rio Preto 
 José Joaquín Pérez Mascayano, Chilean politician, served as the President of Chile 
 José de Jesús Pimiento Rodríguez, Colombian Catholic bishop and cardinal, Auxiliary bishop of Pasto, Bishop of Montería, Bishop of Garzón, then Archbishop of Manizales, made a Cardinal by Pope Francis in 2015 
 José Laureano Pineda Ugarte, Nicaraguan politician, twice Head of State of Nicaragua 
 José Piñera, Chilean economist, architect of Chile's private Pension system 
 José María Pino Suárez, Mexican statesman, jurist, poet, journalist and revolutionary, 7th Vice President of Mexico, assassinated in 1913 as an outcome of the period of civil unrest called Ten Tragic Days
 José Manuel Pirela, Venezuelan-American professional baseball player 
 José Maria Pires, Brazilian Catholic bishop, Bishop of Araçuaí, then Archbishop of Paraíba 
 José Pizarro, Spanish-born UK chef, restaurateur and author of cookbooks
 José da Cruz Policarpo, Portuguese Catholic bishop, cardinal and writer, before episcopacy director of the Penafirme seminary, rector of the Olivais seminary, dean of the Theological Faculty of the Portuguese Catholic University and two terms as the university's rector, then Auxiliary bishop of Lisbon, Coadjutor Archbishop of Lisbon, and Patriarch of Lisbon in 1998 named as Dom José IV, made Cardinal by Pope John Paul II in 2001
 Jose Casiano Portilla, Mexican-born American football player
 José Guillermo Abel López Portillo y Pacheco, Mexican lawyer and politician, 51st President of Mexico
 José Guadalupe Posada Aguilar, Mexican political printmaker and engraver
 José Maria da Ponte e Horta, Portuguese noble, colonial administrator and soldier, formerly Governor of Angola, Governor of Macau and Governor of Mozambique
 José María Pérez de Urdininea, third President of Bolivia and the first to be born in that country 
 Jose Porunnedom, Indian-born Syro-Malabar Catholic bishop, Eparch (Bishop) of Mananthavady
 José Posada y Herrera, Spanish jurist and politician, served as Prime Minister under King Alfonso XII 
 José Ángel Pozo la Rosa, Spanish professional football player 
 José Pedro Pozzi, Italian born, member of Salesians of Don Bosco, Bishop of Alto Valle del Río Negro 
 José Antônio Rezende de Almeida Prado, known as Almeida Prado, Brazilian composer and pianist 
 Jose Prakash, Indian singer and film actor
 José Prieto, Mexican cyclist and Olympics competitor 
 José Joaquín Prieto Vial, Chilean military figure and politician, twice President of Chile
 José Antonio Primo de Rivera y Sáenz de Heredia, Spanish lawyer, noble, politician, 1st Duke of Primo de Rivera, 3rd Marquis of Estella, founder of the Falange Española 
 José Manuel Puig Casauranc, Mexican medical practitioner, politician, diplomat and journalist

Q

 José Humberto Quintero Parra, Venezuelan Catholic bishop and cardinal, Coadjutor Archbishop then Archbishop of Mérida, made Cardinal by Pope John XXIII in 1961, the first Venezuelan so appointed 
 José Quiroga, Chilean-born cardiologist now based in America, co-founder and medical director of the Program for Torture Victims, Vice-President of the International Rehabilitation Council for Torture Victims

R

 José Ramirez, Spanish luthier and founder of Ramirez Guitars
 José Ramírez III, Spanish luthier and practitioner in Ramirez Guitars
 José Carlos Ramírez, American professional boxer, Olympics competitor 
 José Enrique Ramírez, Dominican-born American baseball player
 José Luis Ramírez, retired Mexican boxer, two-time World Lightweight Champion 
 José Luis Ramírez, Mexican NASCAR driver 
 José Ramos-Horta, East Timorese politician, founder and former member of Fretilin, 2nd President of the Independent Republic of East Timor, Nobel Peace Prize winner 
 José Maria Raygada y Gallo, Peruvian politician, twice Prime Minister of Peru 
 Jose Raymond, nicknamed "The Boston Mass", American professional bodybuilder 
 José Manuel Reina Páez, usually known as Pepe, Spanish international football player
 José Antonio Reyes, Spanish professional football player 
 José Bernabé Reyes, Dominican-American baseball player 
 José Afonso Ribeiro, Brazilian Catholic bishop, member of the Third Order of Saint Francis, Bishop of Borba 
 José Cláudio Ribeiro da Silva, nicknamed Zé Cláudio, Brazilian conservationist and environmentalist, shot and killed in an anti-logging campaign
 José Maria Espírito Santo Silva Ricciardi, Portuguese banker and economist 
 José de la Riva-Agüero y Osma, Peruvian noble with the titles 6th Marquès de Montealegre de Aulestia and 5th Marquès de Casa-Dávila, historian, writer and politician, 84th Prime Minister of Peru
 José Mariano de la Cruz de la Riva-Agüero y Sánchez Boquete, Peruvian noble with the title Marqués de Montealegre de Aulestia, soldier, politician, and historian, 1st President of Peru, 2nd President of North Peru
 José Carlos Fulgencio Pedro Regalado de la Riva-Agüero y Looz Corswarem, Belgian-born Peruvian politician and diplomat 
 Jose Rivera, American politician, member of the New York State Assembly
 José Rivera, Puerto Rican volleyball player
 José Rivera, playwright, first Puerto Rican screenwriter to be nominated for an Academy Award
 José Antonio Rivera, Puerto Rican-born American professional boxer 
 José Eustasio Rivera Salas, Colombian lawyer, poet and author primarily known for his national epic The Vortex
 José Manuel Rivera Galván, Mexican professional football player
 José Rivera Díaz, Puerto Rican businessman and former politician, mayor of Trujillo Alto (1977–1980)
 José Luis Rivera Guerra, Puerto Rican politician 
 Jose de Rivera, American abstract sculptor, represented in major collections
 José Protasio Rizal Mercado y Alonso Realonda, Filipino nationalist, author and polymath, ophthalmologist by profession, advocate for independence during the Philippine Revolution and executed for his involvement, now regarded as a national hero 
 José Ramón Rodil y Campillo, Spanish noble with the titles 1st Marquis of Rodil and 3rd Viscount of Trobo, military general and statesman, served as Prime Minister under Prince Baldomero Espartero, Regent for Queen Isabella II 
 José Enrique Rodó, Uruguayan essayist 
 José Antonio Rodríguez Muñoz, Spanish flamenco guitarist, composer and music professor 
 José Rodrigues de Souza, Brazilian Catholic bishop, member of the Congregation of the Most Holy Redeemer (C.Ss.R.), Bishop of Juazeiro
 José Luis Rodríguez Zapatero, Spanish lawyer and politician, Prime Minister of Spain
 José Manuel Rodriguez Delgado, Spanish-born American psychologist and university professor, noted for research into mind control through electrical brain stimulation 
 José Rodrigues Miguéis, Portuguese translator and writer, self-exiled in the United States, became translator and editor for Reader's Digest
 José Antonio Rodríguez Vega, Spanish serial killer and rapist 
 Jose Romussi, Chilean embroiderer, now represented in major international collections
 José Casimiro Rondeau Pereyra, general and politician in Argentina and Uruguay in the early 19th century, Supreme Director of the United Provinces of the Río de la Plata, Governor and Captain General of Uruguay
 José Roosevelt, Brazilian painter and illustrator
 José Alberto Rozo Gutiérrez, Colombian Catholic bishop, Apostolic Vicar of the Apostolic Vicariate of Puerto Gaitán

S
 
 José Sabogal, Peruvian early modern painter and muralist, recognised as a leader in revival of indigenist style 
 José de Jesús Sahagún de la Parra, Mexican Catholic bishop, Bishop of Tula, then Bishop of Ciudad Lázaro Cárdenas 
  José Hipólito Salas y Toro, Chilean Catholic theologian and bishop, Bishop of Concepción (now known as the Concepción, offered a cardinalate by Pope Pius IX which he refused 
 José Mariano Salas, Mexican general, twice Interim President of Mexico, Co-Regent of Mexico under the Second Mexican Empire 
 José Salazar López, Mexican Catholic bishop and cardinal, Coadjutor bishop, Bishop of Zamora, then Archbishop of Guadalajara
 José Antonio Salcedo y Ramírez, known as Pepillo, Spanish-born to parents from Santo Domingo, led the civil war for restoration of the Dominican Republic, became 1st head of state after the Spanish withdrawal, later opposed and assassinated by Nationalists allegedly for his support for Spain
 José Andres Salvatierra López, Costa Rican international football player 
 José Enrique Sánchez, known professionally as José Enrique, retired Spanish football player 
 Jose Tomas Sanchez, Filipino Catholic bishop and cardinal, Auxiliary bishop of Cáceres, Coadjutor bishop then Bishop of Lucena, Archbishop of Nueva Segovia, appointment to the Roman Curia, first to the Congregation for the Evangelization of Peoples then simultaneously to the Congregation for the Clergy and the Administration of the Patrimony of the Apostolic See, made Cardinal Deacon by Pope John Paul II in 1991 and elevated to Cardinal Priest by the same pope in 2002
 José Sánchez-Guerra y Martínez, Spanish journalist, lawyer and politician, Prime Minister under King Alfonso XIII 
 José Hernán Sánchez Porras, Venezuelan Catholic bishop, Bishop of the Military Ordinariate of Venezuela
 José María Sánchez-Verdú, Spanish award-winning composer 
 José León Sandoval, Nicaraguan politician, Head of State of Nicaragua
 José Francisco de San Martín y Matorras, Argentine general, El Libertador of Argentina, Chile and Peru, member of the Third Triumvirate of Argentina, 1st President of Peru
 José Sanjurjo y Sacanell, Spanish Army general, granted title of 1st Marquis of the Rif (marqués del Rif) by King King Alfonso XIII, nicknamed as El León del Rif 
 José Manuel Santana Silvestre, Dominican economist and diplomat, specialist in technology and development
José Adeón Santos León, Chilean jockey, member of the National Museum of Racing and Hall of Fame 
 José Joaquim dos Santos, Portuguese Baroque composer especially of sacred vocal music 
 José Hermano Baptista Saraiva, Portuguese professor, historian, jurist, politician and diplomat, writer and television presenter of travel programs 
 José de Sousa Saramago, Portuguese author, recipient of the Nobel Prize in literature 
 José Manuel Eufrasio Quiroga Sarmiento y Funes, Argentinian Catholic bishop, Bishop of San Juan de Cuyo 
 José Sarney, 20th Vice President of Brazil, 31st President of Brazil, then President of the Brazilian Senate 
 José Trinidad Sepúlveda Ruiz-Velasco, Mexican Catholic bishop, Archbishop of Tuxtla, Bishop of San Juan de los Lagos 
 José Luis Serna Alzate, Colombian Catholic bishop, Bishop of Florencia, then first Bishop of the newly created Diocese of Líbano–Honda
 José Serrano Simeón, Spanish composer of zarzuelas 
 José Serrato, Uruguayan politician, 24th President of Uruguay
 José Silva, parapsychologist, author of "Silva Method" and "Silva UltraMind ESP System"
 José da Silva, Portuguese sports shooter and Olympics competitor 
 José António Silva, known professionally as José da Silva, Portuguese sprint canoer and Olympics competitor
 José Asunción Silva, Colombian poet, listed among founders of Spanish–American Modernism 
 José Graziano da Silva, American-born Brazilian agronomist and writer 
 José Gabriel de Silva-Bazán y Waldstein, Spanish noble titled 10th Marquess of Santa Cruz, diplomat, art director, statesman and court official, Ambassador to London, first Director of the Prado Museum, served briefly as First Secretary of State under King Ferdinand VI, Mayordomo mayor (High Steward) to the court of King Ferdinand VII 
 José Benedito Simão, Brazilian Catholic bishop, Auxiliary bishop of São Paulo, then Bishop of Assis 
 José Sisto, Commissioner of Guam
 José Sócrates Carvalho Pinto de Sousa, commonly known as José Sócrates, Portuguese politician, 117th Prime Minister of Portugal 
 José Song Sui-Wan (traditional Chinese: 宋瑞雲; simplified Chinese: 宋瑞云), Chinese-born Brazilian member of the Salesians of Don Bosco (S.D.B.) and Catholic bishop, Bishop of São Gabriel da Cachoeira
 José Manuel Soria, Spanish academic and politician 
 José Rómulo Sosa Ortiz, known professionally as José José, Mexican singer and actor
 Rubin Statham, often referred to as JoséNew Zealand professional tennis player

T

 José Bernardo de Tagle y Portocarrero, Peruvian noble titled 4th Marquis of Torre Tagle, soldier and politician, 5th President of Peru
 José Luis Tejada Sorzano, 40th President of Bolivia during the Chaco War
 José Théodore, French Canadian ice hockey goaltender 
  José Tomás Pérez Sellés, Spanish classical guitarist and teacher 
 José de León Toral, assassin of the Mexican President Álvaro Obregón
 José Torres, Mexican long-distance runner and Olympics competitor
 José Torres, nicknamed Chegüi, Puerto Rican-American professional boxer, Olympic medallist, author, writer for The Village Voice and New York's Spanish language newspaper El Diario La Prensa 
 José Torres, Chilean cyclist and Olympics competitor 
 Jose Torres, commonly known as Joey Torres, American politician, twice Mayor of Paterson, New Jersey
 José Torres, Cuban-Polish musician and percussionist 
 José Torres, known by ring names Black Pain and Monster Pain, Puerto Rican professional wrestler
 José Alfredo Torres Huitrón, Mexican politician 
 José Mario Anthony Torres, nicknamed Chalate, Panamanian international football player
 José Antonio Torres, Mexican film director and producer, and musician 
 José Antonio Torres, Cuban journalist, imprisoned for spying 
 José Antonio Torres Martinó, Puerto Rican painter, journalist and writer 
 José Augusto Costa Sénica Torres, nicknamed O Bom Gigante, Portuguese international football player and coach 
 José Fernández Torres, known as Tomatito, Spanish flamenco guitarist
 José Filipe Torres, Portuguese entrepreneur, consultant in nation branding
 José Francisco Torres Mezzell, known to the public as Gringo Torres, American professional football player 
 José Marcos Torres, Venezuelan-American baseball player 
 José María Torres, Uruguayan-born Argentinian soldier to the rank of lieutenant colonel, active in the Argentine War of Independence 
 José Ortega Torres, Spanish poet and university professor, wrote under the pen names Narzeo Antino and Aldo Fresno 
 José Sigona Torres, Mexican politician 
 José Torres Laboy, Puerto Rican sport shooter, medallist at the 2011 Pan American Games, Olympics competitor 
 José Torres Ramírez, commonly known as Pito Torres, Puerto Rican politician 
 José de Torres y Martínez Bravo, Spanish Baroque composer, organist, music theorist and music publisher 
 José Ernesto Torres Zamora commonly known as Pichy Torres, Puerto Rican politician 
 José Félix Trespalacios, Mexican politician and soldier to the rank of colonel, active in the militia in Chihuahua, 1st Governor of Coahuila y Texas in the United Mexican States
 José Manuel Nunes Salvador Tribolet, Portuguese electrical engineer, professor of information systems at the Technical University of Lisbon, known for his work on speech coding

U

 José Domingo Ulloa Mendieta, Panamanian friar of the Order of Saint Augustine (O.S.A.) and Catholic bishop, Auxiliary bishop then Archbishop of Panamá, opponent to capital punishment 
 José Miguel Ureña Rodriguez, Dominican professional basketball player 
 José Félix Evaristo de Uriburu y Álvarez de Arenales, Argentine diplomat and politician, 8th Vice President of Argentina, 1st de facto President of Argentina
 José María Urquinaona y Bidot (or Vidot), Spanish Catholic bishop, Bishop of Barcelona (now known as the Archdiocese of Barcelona
 José María Usandizaga, Spanish Basque composer

V

 José Bordas Valdez, Dominican politician, 2nd Provisional President appointed by the Congress of the Dominican Republic
 José Valentín, Puerto Rican baseball player 
 José Gregorio Valera, Venezuelan revolutionary and politician, President of Venezuela 
 José Sótero Valero Ruz, Venezuelan Catholic bishop, Bishop of Guanare 
 José Cecilio Díaz Del Valle, nicknamed el sabio (The Wise), Guatemalan-born Mexican philosopher, politician, lawyer, and journalist, author of the Act of Independence of Central America
 José Desiderio Valverde Pérez, Spanish soldier to the rank of general, served with distinction in the Spanish colonies including appointment as 4th and last Captain General of Santo Domingo during the Spanish occupation, after Spanish withdrawal appointed as governor-general of the Philippine islands
 José Rafael Valverde, Dominican-born American baseball player
 Jose Antonio Vargas, Filipino American journalist and Pulitzer Prize winner
 José Dorángel Vargas Gomez, Venezuelan serial killer and cannibal 
 José María Vargas Ponce, Venezuelan medical practitioner, revolutionary and politician, President of Venezuela 
 José Vasconcelos Calderón, Mexican writer, philosopher and politician 
 José Leite de Vasconcelos, Portuguese ethnographer and philologist 
 José Mauro de Vasconcelos, Brazilian writer 
 José Antonio Vélez Jiménez, known as Ñoño (Ninth), Spanish professional football player 
 José Augusto Ferreira Veiga, Viscount of Arneiro, born in Portuguese Macau, Portuguese composer 
 José Miguel de Velasco Franco, Vice-President then four times President of Bolivia
 José María Tranquilino Francisco de Jesús Velasco Gómez Obregón, generally known as José María Velasco, Mexican painter 
 José Nieto Velázquez, Spanish court official, chamberlain to Queen Elisabeth of Spain, keeper of the royal tapestries, possible figure in paintings Portrait of a Man and Las Meninas  by his brother Diego Velázquez
 José Velázquez Jiménez, known to the public as José Velez, Spanish singer 
 José Raúl Vera López, Mexican friar of the Dominican Order and Catholic bishop, Bishop of Ciudad Altamirano, Coadjutor bishop of San Cristóbal de Las Casas, then Bishop of Saltillo 
 José María Verdugo, born in New Spain, soldier from the Presidio of San Diego, granted extensive land in present-day California
 José Carlos Amaral Vieira, Brazilian composer, pianist, and musicologist 
 José Luis de Vilallonga, Spanish noble titled Marquis of Castellbell, author and actor
 José Vizcaíno, American baseball player

W

 José Wilker, Brazilian actor

X

 José Carlos Caetano Xavier, Portuguese marine biologist and Antarctic explorer, co-founder of the Association of Polar Early Career Scientists (APECS)
 José Nuno Rodrigues Xavier, Portuguese-born UK professional football player
 José Ximénez, also known as José Jiménez or Jusepe Ximénez, Spanish Baroque composer and organist

Y

 José Antonio Yorba, also known as Don José Antonio Yorba I, Spanish soldier and early settler of Spanish California 
 José Yulo Yulo, Filipino lawyer, jurist and politician, Chief Justice of the Supreme Court of the Philippines 
 José Francisco Yunes Zorrilla, Filipino politician, Senator of the LXII Legislature of the Mexican Congress

Z

 José Luis Rodríguez Zapatero, Spanish politician, served for two terms as Prime Minister under King Juan Carlos I 
 José Santos Zelaya López, Nicaraguan politician, 11th President of Nicaragua
 Jose Zepeda, American professional boxer
 José Zorrilla y Moral, Spanish Catholic Romantic poet and dramatist 
 José Antonio Laureano de Zubiría y Escalante, Mexican Catholic bishop, Bishop of Durango (now known as the Archdiocese of Durango), supporter of the Centralist Republic of Mexico and critic of the United States' control of the northern part of his diocese 
 José Zúñiga, Honduran-born American screen and television actor
 José Zúñiga, Mexican Neo-figurative painter, represented internationally in private and public collections
 José de Zúñiga, Mexican-born soldier to the ran of lieutenant colonel, settler in California and Arizona, Commandant of the Presidio of San Diego, member of the Third Order of Franciscans

Middle name

 Agostinho José Sartori, Brazilian Catholic bishop, Bishop of Palmas–Francisco Beltrão
 Airton José dos Santos, Brazilian Catholic bishop, Bishop of Mogi das Cruzes and then Archbishop of Campinas 
 Aloysio José Leal Penna, Brazilian Catholic bishop, first as Bishop of Paulo Afonso, then as Archbishop of Botucatu
 Ángel José Macín, Argentinian Catholic bishop, Bishop of Reconquista
 António José de Almeida, 6th President of Portugal
 António José de Ávila, 1st Duke of Ávila and Bolama, Portuguese politician
 Antonio José Cavanilles, Spanish taxonomist and botanist 
 Antonio José de Irisarri Alonso, Guatemalan statesman, journalist, and politician, served as Interim Supreme Director of Chile, considered as one of the fathers of Chilean journalism
 Antonio José Martínez Palacios, known as Antonio José, Spanish composer 
 António José Severim de Noronha, 1st Duke of Terceira, Portuguese military officer to the rank of colonel and statesman 
 António José da Silva, Portuguese dramatist
 Antonio José de Sucre y Alcalá, Venezuelan noble with the title Gran Mariscal de Ayacucho, leader in gaining independence for Peru and Bolivia, 4th President of Peru and 2nd President of Bolivia
 Camilo José Cela, Spanish novelist and Nobel Prize in literature 
 Daniel José Santomé Lemus, known as Dalas Review, Spanish YouTuber
 Epaminondas José de Araújo, Brazilian Catholic bishop, Bishop of Palmeira dos Índios 
 Francisco José de Caldas, known as el sabio (The Wise), Colombian lawyer, army officer to the rank of lieutenant colonel, military engineer, self-taught naturalist, mathematician, geographer and inventor, executed during the Spanish American Reconquista for favouring submission to Spain by taking an oath
 Francisco José Debali, Hungarian-born Uruguayan composer and author of the Uruguayan national anthem
 Francisco José de Goya y Lucientes, Spanish painter 
 Francisco José Urrutia Olano, Colombian diplomat and international jurist 
 Guillermo José Garlatti, Italian-born Argentinian Catholic bishop, Auxiliary bishop of La Plata, Bishop of San Rafael, then Archbishop of Bahía Blanca
 Héctor José Cámpora, Argentinian dentist and politician, 38th President of Argentina
 Joaquín José de Melgarejo y Saurín, Spanish noble titled 1st Duke of San Fernando de Quiroga, soldier to the rank of brigadier general and statesman, fought in the Peninsular War served as First Secretary of State under King Ferdinand VI, donated Velázquez's Christ Crucified to Madrid's Prado Museum 
 Joaquín José Morón Hidalgo, Venezuelan Catholic bishop, Bishop of Valle de la Pascua, then Bishop of Acarigua–Araure 
 Juan José Campanella, Argentinian film producer and director
 Juan Cayetano José María Gómez de Portugal y Solís, Mexican seminary professor and Catholic bishop, Bishop of Michoacán (later renamed as the Archdiocese of Michoacán then as the Archdiocese of Morelia 
 Juan José Estrada, Mexican professional boxer 
 José Dolores Estrada Morales, Nicaraguan politician, Acting President of Nicaragua
  Juan José Estrada Morales, Nicaraguan member of armed services to the rank of general, revolutionary and politician, Provisional President of Nicaragua 
 Juan José Flores y Aramburu, Venezuelan military general, later opposed to Spain's rule, a member of Simón Bolívar's Patriot army, Supreme Chief of Ecuador after Spain's expulsion, 1st President of the new Republic of Ecuador
 Juan José de Amézaga Landaroso, Uruguayan lawyer, university professor and politician, 28th President of Uruguay 
 Juan José Martí, Spanish novelist
 Juan José Padilla, Spanish matador, after wearing an eyepatch following injuries nicknamed El Pirata (The Pirate)
 Juan José Torres, Spanish athlete and Olympics competitor
 Juan José Torres González, popularly known as "J.J." (Jota-Jota), Bolivian military leader to the rank of commander-in-chief and politician, 61st President of Bolivia
 Juan José Viamonte González, Argentinian soldier and head of state, 12th and 15th Governor of Buenos Aires Province 
 Justo José de Urquiza y García, Argentine general and politician, Governor of Entre Ríos Province, Provisional Director of the Argentine Confederation, President of the Argentine Confederation
 Leopoldo José Brenes Solórzano, Nicaraguan Catholic bishop and cardinal, Auxiliary bishop of Managua, Bishop of Matagalpa, then Archbishop of Managua, made a Cardinal by Pope Francis in 2014
 Lijo Jose Pellissery, Indian award-winning film director 
 Luciano José Cabral Duarte, Brazilian Catholic bishop, founder of the Federal University of Sergipe, Auxiliary bishop then Archbishop of Aracajú
 Luis José de Orbegoso y Moncada-Galindo, de Burutarán y Morales, Peruvian noble titled 5th Count de Olmos, soldier to the rank of brigadier general and politician, 11th and 12th President of Peru, 1st President of North Peru 
 Luis José Sartorius y Tapia, Spanish noble titled1st Count of San Luis, journalist, politician and statesman, served as Prime Minister under Queen Isabella II
 Mariano José de Larra, Spanish Romantic writer and journalist
 Marie José of Belgium, wife of the last monarch Umberto II of Italy, Queen-consort for 20 days and jokingly nicknamed "the May Queen"
 Miguel José de Azanza Alegría, Spanish noble titled Duke of Santa Fe, politician and diplomat and viceroy of New Spain 
 Marie-José Nat, French actress
 Marie-José Pérec, French athlete and triple Olympic champion
 Marie-Josée Croze, Canadian Actor
 Marie-Josée Saint-Pierre, French Canadian documentary filmmaker 
 Manuel José Macário do Nascimento Clemente, Portuguese Catholic bishop and cardinal, Auxiliary bishop of Lisbon, Bishop of Porto, and Patriarch of Lisbon under the name Dom Manuel III, made a Cardinal by Pope Francis in 2015
 Miguel José Asurmendi Aramendía, Spanish Catholic bishop, Bishop of Tarazona, then Bishop of Vitoria 
 Moacyr José Vitti, Brazilian Catholic bishop, Auxiliary bishop of Curitiba, then Bishop of Piracicaba 
 Miguel José Yacamán, Mexican physicist, major contributor to the development of nanotechnology
 Pedro José Calderón, Peruvian lawyer, diplomat and politician, 8th Prime Minister of Peru 
 Pedro José Domingo de Guerra, Bolivian statesman, jurist and diplomat, 24th President of Bolivia 
 Pedro José de Fonte y Hernández Miravete, Spanish-born Mexican Catholic bishop, Archbishop of Mexico, crowned the first Emperor of Mexico, Agustín de Iturbide, and the Empress Ana María de Huarte y Muñiz 
 Sebastião José de Carvalho e Melo, 1st Marquis of Pombal, Portuguese statesman 
 Pedro José Rada y Gamio, Peruvian politician, Mayor of Lima, 74th Prime Minister of Peru 
  Ramón José de Arce y Rebollar, Spanish Catholic bishop, Archbishop of Burgos, Grand Inquisitor of the Spanish Inquisition, Archbishop of Zaragoza, Patriarch of the West Indies, was understood as being pro-French when Spain was invaded by the First French Empire and exiled to Paris when Spain gained independence during the Peninsular War 
 Remídio José Bohn, Brazilian Catholic bishop, Auxiliary bishop of Porto Alegre, then Bishop of Cachoeira do Sul 
 Ricardo José Weberberger, Austrian-born Brazilian Benedictine monk (O.S.B.) and Catholic bishop, Bishop of Barreiras 
 Urbano José Allgayer, Brazilian Catholic bishop, Auxiliary bishop of Porto Alegre, then Bishop of Passo Fundo (now known as the Archdiocese of Passo Fundo

Surname
 Edward José (1865–1930), Belgian film director and actor
 Francisco Sionil José (1924–2022), Filipino novelist
 Jorge V. José, Mexican physicist
 Mohan Jose, Indian actor in Malayalam films
 Nicholas Jose, British-born Australian novelist
 Richard Jose (1862–1941), British-born American singer

See also
 Jose
 José Antonio
 José Carlos
 José María
 Josefa (given name)
 Joséphine (given name) including Josephine and Josefine
 Josetxu (given name)
 San José (disambiguation)
 São José (disambiguation)

Notes

Portuguese masculine given names
Spanish masculine given names

eo:Jozefo#Gravaj Jozefoj